The following listed below are the videography of South Korean boy group, BtoB. This includes their notable group and individual activities that they've done since debut in 2012.

Music videos

Korean

Japanese

Video albums

Filmography

Drama series and cameos

Reality shows

Variety shows

See also 
 BtoB discography

References

Videographies of South Korean artists
V